Kristian Bang Foss (born 1977) is a Danish writer. His debut novel Fiskens vindue (The Window of the Fish, 2004) was acclaimed by critics. This was followed by Stormen i 99 (The Storm in 99, 2008). He won the EU Prize for Literature for his novel Døden kører Audi (Death drives an Audi, 2012).

References

1977 births
Living people
Place of birth missing (living people)
Danish male novelists
21st-century Danish novelists
21st-century Danish male writers